This is a list of feminist periodicals in the United States. A feminist periodical is a journal, magazine, or newsletter that primarily publishes content reflecting the ideologies of the Women's Movement. Though interpretations of feminism vary from one periodical to the next, all of these publications aimed to provide a space for women to express their thoughts, ideas, and goals. This list is by no means exhaustive.

References 

Periodicals
 United States
Periodicals,United States